The grey pratincole (Glareola cinerea) is a species of bird, in the family Glareolidae.

Habitat
It is found on the continent of Africa, in the countries of Angola, Benin, Cameroon, Central African Republic, Chad, Republic of the Congo, Democratic Republic of the Congo, Gabon, Ghana, Mali, Niger, Nigeria, Togo, and Burundi.

References

External links
Image at ADW

grey pratincole
Birds of Central Africa
Birds of West Africa
grey pratincole
grey pratincole
Taxonomy articles created by Polbot